The 1982 Daihatsu Challenge was a women's singles tennis tournament played on indoor carpet courts at the Brighton Centre in Brighton in England. The event was part of the Category 5 tier of the 1982 Toyota Series. It was the fifth edition of the tournament and was held from 25 October through 31 October 1982. First-seeded Martina Navratilova won the singles title, her second at the event after 1979, and earned $28,000 first-prize money.

Finals

Singles
 Martina Navratilova defeated  Chris Evert-Lloyd 6–1, 6–4
It was Navratilova's 13th singles title of the year and the 68th of her career.

Doubles
 Martina Navratilova /  Pam Shriver defeated  Barbara Potter /  Sharon Walsh 2–6, 7–5, 6–4

Prize money

Notes

References

External links
 International Tennis Federation (ITF) tournament event details
 Tournament draws

Daihatsu Challenge
Daihatsu Challenge
Brighton International
Daihatsu Challenge
Daihatsu Challenge